Robert George Burton (August 13, 1895 – September 29, 1962) was an American film and television actor. 

Burton was born in Eastman, Georgia. He appeared in over 100 films and television programs, and was best known for playing Tom Gipson in the 1956 film The Brass Legend. 

He also appeared as a sheriff in the 1957 Gunsmoke episode "What The Whiskey Drummer Heard".

Burton died in September 1962 in Woodland Hills, California, at the age of 67.

 Partial filmography 

 Fearless Fagan (1952) - Owen Gillman
 My Man and I (1952) - Sheriff
 Everything I Have Is Yours (1952) - Dr. Charles
 Desperate Search (1952) - Wayne Langmuir
 Sky Full of Moon (1952) - Customer
 The Bad and the Beautiful (1952) - McDill (uncredited)
 Above and Beyond (1952) - Brigadier General Samuel E. Roberts
 Confidentially Connie (1953) - Dr. Willis Shoop
 The Girl Who Had Everything (1953) - John Ashmond
 Code Two (1953) - Police Capt. Bill Williams
 Cry of the Hunted (1953) - Warden Keeley
 Fast Company (1953) - David Sandring
 A Slight Case of Larceny (1953) - Police Captain
 The Band Wagon (1953) - Caterer (uncredited)
 Latin Lovers (1953) - Mr. Cumberly
 Inferno (1953) - Sheriff
 The Big Heat (1953) - Gus Burke
 All the Brothers Were Valiant (1953) - Asa Worthen
 Taza, Son of Cochise (1954) - General George Crook
 Riot in Cell Block 11 (1954) - Guard Ambrose
 Siege at Red River (1954) - Sheriff
 Broken Lance (1954) - Mac Andrews
 Rogue Cop (1954) - Inspector Adrian Cassidy
 Hit the Deck (1955) - Commander (uncredited)
 A Man Called Peter (1955) - Mr. Peyton
 The Road to Denver (1955) - Pete
 Lay That Rifle Down (1955) - General Ballard
 The Last Command (1955) - Businessman in Cantina (uncredited)
 The Left Hand of God (1955) - Rev. Marvin (uncredited)
 Count Three and Pray (1955) - Bishop
 Jubal (1956) - Dr. Grant
 Reprisal! (1956) - Jeb Cantrell
 The Rack (1956) - Col. Ira Hansen
 Three Brave Men (1956) - W. L. Dietz
 The Brass Legend (1956) - Tom Gipson
 The Tall T (1957) - Tenvoorde
 Slander (1957) - Harry Walsh (uncredited)
 The Spirit of St. Louis (1957) - Maj. Albert Lambert (Lindbergh Sponsor) - (uncredited)
 The Hired Gun (1957) - Nathan Conroy
 Domino Kid (1957) - Sheriff Travers
 No Down Payment (1957) - Mr. Cagle (uncredited)
 I Was a Teenage Frankenstein (1957) - Dr. Karlton
 The Hard Man (1957) - Sheriff Hacker
 The Young Lions (1958) - Col. Mead (uncredited)
 Too Much, Too Soon (1958) - Bill Henning (uncredited)
 Man or Gun (1958) - Deputy Sheriff Burt Burton
 Mardi Gras (1958) - Comdr. Tydings
 Compulsion (1959) - Charles Straus
 The 30 Foot Bride of Candy Rock (1959) - First General
 A Private's Affair (1959) - Gen. Charles E. Hargrave
 Space Invasion of Lapland (1959) - Dr. Frederick Wilson
 The Story on Page One (1959) - District Attorney Nordeau
 Wake Me When It's Over (1960) - Col. Dowling
 The Gallant Hours (1960) - Maj. Gen. Roy Geiger
 Seven Ways from Sundown (1960) - Eavens
 The Absent-Minded Professor (1961) - Sam Wheeler (uncredited)
 The Young Savages (1961) - Judge
 Ada (1961) - Committee Man (uncredited)
 Sweet Bird of Youth (1962) - Director (uncredited)
 Birdman of Alcatraz (1962) - Sen. Ham Lewis (uncredited)
 The Manchurian Candidate (1962) - Convention Chairman (uncredited)
 Billy Rose's Jumbo (1962) - Madison
 The Slime People (1963) - Professor Galbraith

References

External links 

Rotten Tomatoes profile

1895 births
1962 deaths
People from Eastman, Georgia
Male actors from Georgia (U.S. state)
American male film actors
American male television actors
20th-century American male actors
Male Western (genre) film actors